The South Bend Public Transportation Corporation (commonly known as Transpo) is a municipal bus system that serves the cities of South Bend and Mishawaka, as well as the nearby suburbs of Notre Dame and Roseland, in the very north of the U.S. state of Indiana. It is the most recent incarnation of the South Bend Railway Company, a street railway company that was founded on May 25, 1885. Transpo receives funding from local, state and federal taxes.

Overview

TRANSPO is a hub-and-spoke system, with routes radiating from the center towards the outward corners of the metropolitan area. It is made up of 18 fixed bus routes. It also operates an on-demand paratransit service. In Mishawaka, it serves as a de facto school bus service. South Street Station serves as a system hub, linking together most of the routes.

The system runs Monday-Saturday, operating 5:50 AM – 10:00 PM on weekdays and 6:00 AM – 6:45 PM on Saturdays. It does not operate on Sundays or major holidays. All buses are equipped with bike racks. In 2014, Transpo began converting the aging fleet to compressed natural gas (CNG) with the arrival of 14 New Flyer buses.

Routes
TRANSPO has 18 individual routes and 1 additional “Gameday Express” service for Notre Dame home games.

1 Madison/Mishawaka
3A Portage
3B Portage
4 Lincolnway/Airport
5 North Michigan
6 South Michigan
7 Notre Dame/University Park Mall
8 Miami/Scottsdale
9 Northside/Mishawaka
10 Western
11 Southside/Mishawaka
12 Rum Village
13 Corby/Town & Country
14 Sample/Mayflower 
15A University Park Mall/Mishawaka via Main
15B University Park Mall/Mishawaka via Grape
16 Blackthorn Express/II
17 The Sweep (shuttle service for ND campus)
 GAMEDAY Express (shuttle service for select downtown hotels to ND)

Fares 

The fares have been increased several times during the system's history. The most recent increase was on April 5, 2010. The fares are now the following: 
 Base Fare: $1.00
 Reduced Fare: $0.50
 Day Pass: $3.00
 2 Week Pass: $18.00
 Adult 31 Day Pass $35.00
 Student 31 Day Pass: $30.00
 Access Fare: $2.00
 Access Two Ride Card: $4.00
 Access Ten Ride Card: $20.00

University of Notre Dame, Saint Mary's College students, faculty and staff can ride for free provided they show a valid ID. As of January 2012, Ivy Tech Students can ride with a student ID and validation sticker (sticker is available for $20 from Ivy Tech). Holy Cross students pay regular fare.

Connections to other transit systems

Route 4 stops at the South Bend International Airport. The airport doubles as a regional transit hub. Coach USA buses stop there (and formerly, so did Greyhound Lines buses), and the airport terminal building incorporates the eponymous South Shore Line station The South Shore Line links South Bend to the city of Chicago, making stops at cities, villages and other miscellaneous municipalities throughout Northern Indiana. Route 2 stops at the city's Amtrak station.  Route 5 connects to Niles DART Route 2 at Auten Rd/933 stop Monday-Friday. Route 9 links up with the Interurban Trolley system's Bittersweet/Mishawaka Route at Twin Branch Park. The route links Mishawaka to Downtown Elkhart.

Hubs/transfer centers

South Street Station

South Street Station is the primary hub of the system. It is located in Downtown South Bend. The station includes a  building containing waiting areas, public restrooms, and other facilities.

Efforts planning this station date back to 1992. It was envisioned to be an intermodal transit hub that would feature a new station for Amtrak (replacing South Bend's existing Amtrak station) in addition to a transit center for South Bend Transpo. It was also envisioned that the station would house intercity bus services and a bus transit link to South Bend's airport. It was envisioned that, in addition to larger buses, smaller electric-powered shuttle buses would also be serving the transit center. A parking garage was planned to be attached to the station. A feasibility study for the project was finished in February 1993. In November 1993, the city of South Bend purchased land for the transit center. The $20.5 million facility received more than $13 million in federal funding by the start of 1997. With the new facility approved, on December 20, 1996, the South Bend Redevelopment Commission approved a proposal by Memorial Health Systems Inc. to build a  complex on the previous lot that was used as a transfer center. The station, during its planning, received criticism from some as an example of "pork barrel spending", receiving the 1996 Oinkers Award in the Pig Book published by Citizens Against Government Waste.

The previous transfer center, located at Main Street and Jefferson Boulevard, closed on June 28, 1997 (a Saturday), and buses moved to the South Street Station's intersection at Main Street and South Street on June 30, 1997 (a Monday). However, the building and the parking lot for buses at the South Street Station were still months away from completion, necessitating the temporary use of on-street parking for buses for several months. South Street Station's facilities were opened in 1998.

When it opened, South Street Station was solely a transfer center for local buses, with the Amtrak component planned to be built at a later date. Ultimately, the Amtrak component failed to materialize. The parking garage originally planned to be attached to the station never materialized. Furthermore, it was not until December 2, 2019, when Greyhound Lines moved its intercity bus service from South Bend International Airport to the South Street Station, that it received intercity bus service. Barons Bus Lines also now provides intercity bus service at South Street Station.

There have been talks of constructing a downtown South Shore Line station for South Bend, replacing the existing station at South Bend International Airport. Such a station, if constructed, might be either adjacent to, or integrated into, the South Street Station. A decision regarding the future of South Bend's South Shore Line station was originally anticipated to be made at some point in 2020.

Mishawaka Transfer Center
The system's secondary transfer center is the Mishawaka Transfer Center, located in Downtown Mishawaka. The station is also served by the Interurban Trolley.

In the early 2000s, there had been consideration given to moving the transfer center from its location at Fourth Street and Church Street to a location closer to the St. Joseph River. This proposal would have the station initially moved to location fronting First Street on the block between Mill Street and Spring Street. This block had been home to a previous Transpo transfer center that had been opened in October 1978. Plans were for this site to potentially be a temporary location, with plans to build a permanent facility on the former Uniroyal land along the St. Joseph River.

References

External links
 Official Website

Bus transportation in Indiana
South Bend – Mishawaka metropolitan area
Transportation in South Bend, Indiana